Viscount Bridgeman, of Leigh in the County of Shropshire, is a title in the Peerage of the United Kingdom. It was created in 1929 for the Conservative politician William Bridgeman, who had previously served as Home Secretary and First Lord of the Admiralty. He was the son of Reverend John Robert Orlando Bridgeman, third son of George Bridgeman, 2nd Earl of Bradford. His son, the second Viscount, served as Lord Lieutenant of Shropshire from 1951 to 1969.  the title is held by the latter's nephew, the third Viscount, who succeeded in 1982. He is one of the ninety elected hereditary peers that remain in the House of Lords after the passing of the House of Lords Act 1999, and sits as a Conservative.

As descendants of the 2nd Earl of Bradford, the Bridgeman viscounts are in the remainder for that earldom.

Family seat
The family seat is Watley House, near Winchester, Hampshire.

Coat of arms
The heraldic blazon for the coat of arms of the barony is: Sable, ten plates, four, three, two, and one, on a chief argent a lion passant ermines.

Viscounts Bridgeman (1929)
William Clive Bridgeman, 1st Viscount Bridgeman (1864–1935)
Robert Clive Bridgeman, 2nd Viscount Bridgeman (1896–1982)
Robin John Orlando Bridgeman, 3rd Viscount Bridgeman (born 1930)

The heir apparent is the present holder's second son, Hon. Luke Robinson Orlando Bridgeman (born 1971).

See also
Earl of Bradford
Bridgeman baronets

References

Kidd, Charles, Williamson, David (editors). Debrett's Peerage and Baronetage (1990 edition). New York: St Martin's Press, 1990.

Viscountcies in the Peerage of the United Kingdom
Noble titles created in 1929
Noble titles created for UK MPs
Viscount

fr:Familles catholiques de la noblesse du Royaume-Uni#Vicomtes